Afus is a city in Central District, in Buin va Miandasht County, Isfahan Province, Iran. At the 2006 census, its population was 3,805, in 1,045 families.

Gallery

References

Populated places in Buin va Miandasht County

Cities in Isfahan Province